This is a Chinese name; the family name is Tam.

Jackie Tam (Chinese:譚佑銘; born December 2, 1988 in Shenzhen, China), is a Chinese singer-songwriter who debuted in 2010 after winning fourth place at the 2010 Super Boy singing competition.

Biography 
Tam was born in Shenzhen, China, and moved to Canada at the age of 15. Later, he was admitted to the University of Toronto, Canada. In the summer of 2010, Tam attended Super Boy in Guangzhou. He finished fourth out of thirteen contestants.

Original songs

References

 F-paper.com article
 Cfensi.dramaddicts.com Viewpoint

Chinese male singer-songwriters
Living people
People from Shenzhen
Musicians from Guangdong
1988 births
Super Boy contestants
Hakka musicians